The General Government of Galicia and Bukovina was a temporary Imperial Russian military administration of eastern parts of the Kingdom of Galicia and Lodomeria captured from Austria-Hungary during World War I.

The administration was established after the Russian victory in the Battle of Galicia, led by the commander-in-chief Nikolai Ivanov in the late summer of 1914. It did not last long and by mid-1915 Russians retreated, following the Gorlice–Tarnów offensive led by the Central Powers overall commander August von Mackensen. During the later stages of the war, the Russian forces tried to reclaim the territory during the military operations of Brusilov and Kerensky. Even if, de facto, it did cease to function after the Great Retreat in 1915, it was not formally abolished until 1917.

Military governors and krai commissars
 5 September 1914 – 14 July 1915: Georgiy Bobrinsky
 4 October 1916 – 31 May 1917: Fyodor Trepov, administrator of the governments of Ternopol and Chernovtsy
 22 April – 2 August 1917: Dmytro Doroshenko, Krai commissar of the Russian Provisional Government

Administrative division
There were four governments (guberniya) that were divided into counties (uyezdy, locally - powiats).
 Lvov Governorate
 Ternopol Governorate
 Chernovtsy Governorate
 Peremyshl Governorate

External links
 World War I. Talerhof
 
 
  Oskin, M. Battle of Galicia. August 1914

Galicia
History of Eastern Galicia
History of Bukovina
Russian Empire in World War I
States and territories established in 1914
States and territories disestablished in 1915
1914 establishments in the Russian Empire
1915 disestablishments in the Russian Empire
Austria-Hungary in World War I
Military occupation